Wild West is a 1925 American silent Western film serial directed by Robert F. Hill. This serial is considered to be a lost film.

Cast

Chapters

 The Land Rush
 On the Show
 The Outlaw Elephant
 Ride 'Em Cowboy
 The Rustler's Stampede
 The Diamond Girl
 The Champion Cowboy
 Under the Buffalo
 Stolen Evidence
 The Law Decides

See also
 List of film serials
 List of film serials by studio
 List of lost films

References

External links

 

1925 films
1925 Western (genre) films
1925 lost films
American silent serial films
American black-and-white films
Films directed by Robert F. Hill
Lost Western (genre) films
Lost American films
Pathé Exchange film serials
Silent American Western (genre) films
1920s American films